Tachina alacer is a species of fly in the genus Tachina of the family Tachinidae that is endemic to Borneo.

References

Insects described in 1932
Diptera of Africa
Endemic fauna of Borneo
alticola